The Yamaha YZF1000R Thunderace was a motorcycle produced by Yamaha from 1996 until 2005.

The YZF1000R was a stop-gap bike from the FZR1000 to the YZF-R1 and produced from existing parts bins. The Thunderace five-valve four-cylinder engine was derived from the FZR1000, and the frame was adapted from the YZF750R. The Genesis engine has undergone some changes aimed at improving mid-range power rather than the maximum output, which remains . The rotating mass of crankshaft and pistons have been lightened to improve throttle response, and new carburetors equipped with "Throttle Position Sensors" give the ignition some more data to help control the EXUP  valve in the exhaust pipe.

References

External links 

 1996 Yamaha YZF1000R Thunderace Fireblade on Steroids motorcycle.com review

YZF1000R Thunderace
Motorcycles introduced in 1996
Sport bikes